This is a list of transfers involving clubs that played in the 2020 League of Ireland Premier Division and 2020 League of Ireland First Division.

The pre-season transfer window opened on 1 December 2019 and closed on 22 February 2020 for domestic transfers and on 2 March 2020 for foreign transfers. Players without a club may join one at any time, either during or in between transfer windows.

Pre-Season Transfers

League of Ireland Premier Division

Bohemians
In:

Out:

Cork City
In:

Out:

Derry City
In:

Out:

Dundalk
In:

Out:

Finn Harps
In:

Out:

St Patrick's Athletic
In:

Out:

Shamrock Rovers
In:

Out:

Shelbourne
In:

Out:

Sligo Rovers
In:

Out:

Waterford
In:

Out:

League of Ireland First Division

Athlone Town
In:

Out:

Bray Wanderers
In:

Out:

Cabinteely
In:

Out:

Cobh Ramblers
In:

Out:

Drogheda United
In:

Out:

Galway United
In:

Out:

Longford Town
In:

Out:

Shamrock Rovers II
In:

Out:

UCD
In:

Out:

Wexford
In:

Out:

References

League of Ireland
Football transfers winter 2019–20
Lists of Republic of Ireland football transfers